20D/Westphal was a periodic comet with an orbital period of 61 years. It fits the classical definition of a Halley-type comet with (20 years < period < 200 years). It was originally discovered by the German astronomer J. G. Westphal (Göttingen, Germany) on July 24, 1852.

It was independently discovered by the American astronomer Christian Heinrich Friedrich Peters (Constantinople) on August 9.

The comet was last seen between September 27 and November 26, 1913, first by Pablo T. Delavan (La Plata Astronomical Observatory) and then others. It was predicted to return in 1976 but was never observed, and is now considered a lost comet.

References

External links 
 Orbital simulation from JPL (Java) / Horizons Ephemeris
 20D/Westphal, Comet Orbit Home Page
 20D at Kronk's Cometography
 Orbital elements,  Infrared Processing and Analysis Center
 20D/Westphal – Minor Planet Center

Periodic comets
Halley-type comets
0020
020D
Lost comets
18520724